Otto Wilhelm Winther (29 November 1891 – 5 April 1983) was a Swedish diplomat.

Career
Winther was born in Helsingborg, Sweden, the son of merchant Otto Jönsson and his wife Christina (née Winther). He passed studentexamen in 1909 and received a Candidate of Law degree from Lund University in 1913. He was then a law clerk at Luggude judicial district from 1913 to 1914. Winther became an attaché at the Ministry for Foreign Affairs in 1916 and served at the Swedish mission in London in 1918 and was second secretary there in 1919. He was secretary to the Foreign Minister in 1920 and secretary of legation in Christiania in 1923. He was director at the Foreign Ministry's political department in 1924, and counsellor of the legation in Paris in 1928. Winther was envoy in Ankara, Athens and Sofia in 1934, Moscow in 1938, Buenos Aires, Montevideo and Asunción in 1940, Prague in 1947, Madrid in 1951 and was ambassador there from 1956 to 1958.

He was also representative at the International Aviation Conference in 1925, the conference for the repeal of export and import restrictions in Paris in 1929, the conference regarding the marketing of agricultural production in Paris in 1931, Bureau of International Expositions in Paris from 1931 to 1934, the International Council for German refugees in Lausanne in 1933, chairman of the Swedish delegation in trade negotiations with Czechoslovakia in 1947, and representative in trade negotiations with Spain from 1952 to 1956. Winther was also the chairman of the Association of the Friends of the Postal Museum (Föreningen Postmusei Vänner) 1958-67 and became an honorary member in 1967.

Personal life
In 1922 Winther married Cornelia Kuylenstierna (born 1897), daughter of major Osvald Kuylenstierna and Elisabeth, née Hammarberg. He was the father of Otto (born 1923), Jan (born 1924), Wiveka (born 1928), Henry (born 1936) and Christian (born 1940). Winther died on 5 April 1983 and was buried on 27 May 1983 at Norra begravningsplatsen in Stockholm.

Awards
Winther's awards:

   Commander Grand Cross of the Order of the Polar Star (15 November 1948)
  Grand Cross of the Order of Civil Merit
  Grand Cross of the Order of the Phoenix
  Grand Cross of the Order of Isabella the Catholic
  Grand Cross of the Order of Merit of the Republic of Hungary
  Commander of the Order of the White Rose of Finland
  Commander of the Order of the Black Star
  Commander of the Order of St. Olav
  Officer of the Legion of Honour
  Officer of the Order of Orange-Nassau

References

1891 births
1983 deaths
Ambassadors of Sweden to Turkey
Ambassadors of Sweden to Greece
Ambassadors of Sweden to Bulgaria
Ambassadors of Sweden to the Soviet Union
Ambassadors of Sweden to Argentina
Ambassadors of Sweden to Uruguay
Ambassadors of Sweden to Paraguay
Ambassadors of Sweden to Czechoslovakia
Ambassadors of Sweden to Spain
People from Helsingborg
Lund University alumni
Commanders Grand Cross of the Order of the Polar Star
Grand Crosses of the Order of the Phoenix (Greece)
Knights Grand Cross of the Order of Isabella the Catholic
Grand Crosses of the Order of Merit of the Republic of Hungary (civil)
Officiers of the Légion d'honneur
Officers of the Order of Orange-Nassau
Burials at Norra begravningsplatsen